Filientomon is a genus of proturans in the family Acerentomidae.

Species
 Filientomon barberi (Ewing, 1921)
 Filientomon bipartitei Lee & Rim, 1988
 Filientomon duodecimsetosum Nakamura, 2004
 Filientomon gentaroanum Nakamura, 2001
 Filientomon imadatei Lee & Rim, 1988
 Filientomon lubricum Imadaté, 1956
 Filientomon sibiricum Szeptycki, 1988
 Filientomon takanawanus (Imadaté, 1956)

References

Protura